Forever Amber may refer to:

Forever Amber (novel), 1944 historical romance novel by Kathleen Winsor
Forever Amber (film), 1947 film adaptation of the novel